The Haikū Stairs, also known as the Stairway to Heaven or Haikū Ladder, is a steep, steel step structure that provided pedestrian access to former U.S. Navy communication facilities on the island of Oahu, Hawaii. The more than 3,000 steps span along Oahu's Ko'olau mountain range. The pathway has been used as a hiking trail at various times but is not open to the public. The city council voted to remove the stairs in 2021.

Early history 

In 1942, contractors for the U.S. Navy began construction of the Haʻikū Radio Station, a top secret facility that was to be used to transmit radio signals to Navy ships that were then operating throughout the Pacific. In order to obtain the necessary height for the antennae, the Navy stretched them across Haikū Valley, a natural amphitheater. Some remnant parts of the wooden ladder may still be seen beside the metal steps. 

The radio station was commissioned in 1943. To transmit such a powerful signal, the Navy needed a transmitter of greater capability than possible with vacuum tube technology at the time. They therefore decided upon an Alexanderson alternator, a huge device capable of generating powerful low-frequency radio signals, and requiring a large antenna.

When the Naval Air Station Kaneohe Bay was transferred to the Marine Corps as Marine Corps Air Station Kaneohe Bay in the 1950s, the U.S. Coast Guard used the Haiku Radio Station site for an Omega Navigation System station. In the mid-1950s, the wooden stairs were replaced by sections of metal steps and ramps — by one count, 3,922 steps. The Coast Guard allowed access in the 1970s but stopped after an appearance on Magnum, P.I. increased visitation.  The station and trail were closed to the public in 1987.

21st century 
In 2003 with plans to reopen the stairs to the public, they were repaired at a cost to the city of $875,000. With no public access available, nearby residents have experienced trespassing and litter on their property. In early 2018, the City and County of Honolulu had stated that there was no plan to open the stairs for public use, citing liability concerns. Some hikers ignored the "no trespassing" signs and continued to climb, contributing to the local community's misgivings about reopening the structure.

In 2020, the Board of Water Supply released a final environmental impact statement that evaluated alternatives. The process collected comments through small-group and public meetings with various agencies, landowners, community organizations, and individuals. It estimated that removal of the stairs could cost as much as $1 million. The board voted unanimously on April 27, 2020 to transfer the Haikū Stairs over to the city since the stairs were a liability that did not align with the agency’s mission. The city had 18 months to take over or the stairs would be torn down. The city anticipated operating the trail as a paid attraction. The city took possession on July 1, 2020. After consideration of the significant liability and maintenance expense for the city along with the impacts to the quality of life for nearby residents, the City Manager was urged to remove the Haikū Stairs by non-binding Resolution 21-154, which unanimously passed by the city council in September 2021. The budgeted cost to remove the stairs grew to $1.3 million. Friends of Haiku Stairs, a volunteer group aimed at preserving the trail, objected to the decision, saying they have a plan managing safe public access and trespassing at no taxpayer cost. The mayor said that removal will proceed as a high-use tourist attraction is inappropriate with an entrance through a residential neighborhood that lacks the room for necessary facilities such as parking.

Incidents
In August 2012, Don Tiki show singer and comedian Fritz Hasenpusch died of a heart attack during his Haikū Stair climb, however there have never been any serious injuries or accidental deaths on the stairs.

There have been several minor injuries in the last decade around the stairs, however, between 2021 and 2022, there have been more injuries and rescues of hikers trying to access the top of the stairs through the now illegal hiking trail via the Moanalua ridge, which is longer and more difficult, resulting in many hikers being rescued “near the Haikū Stairs” and not on the stairs themselves.

In 2014, six people were arrested and 135 were cited for climbing the stairs. The City Prosecutors Office said that criminal trespass in the second degree carries a $1000 fine.

References

External links 

 Video segment on the history & future of the Haiku Stairs, Spectrum News 1

Climbing areas of the United States
Landmarks in Hawaii
Hiking trails in Hawaii
Protected areas of Oahu
Stairways in the United States
1942 establishments in Hawaii